is a Nippon Professional Baseball player for the Yomiuri Giants of Japan's Central League. Before playing for the Giants, he was a member of Fukuoka SoftBank Hawks.

External links

 Career statistics - NPB.jp 
 75 Noriyoshi Omichi PLAYERS2021 - Fukuoka SoftBank Hawks Official site

Living people
1969 births
Baseball people from Mie Prefecture
Japanese baseball players
Nankai Hawks players
Fukuoka Daiei Hawks players
Fukuoka SoftBank Hawks players
Yomiuri Giants players
Nippon Professional Baseball first basemen
Nippon Professional Baseball outfielders
Nippon Professional Baseball coaches
Japanese baseball coaches